Water polo was contested for men only at the 1966 Asian Games in Chula Swimming Stadium, Bangkok, Thailand from 13 to 17 December 1966.

Japan won the gold medal in round robin competition, Singapore won the silver medal and Indonesia 1962 silver medalists this time won the bronze medal.

Medalists

Results

Final standing

References
 Asian Games water polo medalists

External links
 Results

 
1966 Asian Games events
1966
Asian Games
1966 Asian Games